Tuen Mun Government Secondary School (TMGSS/TMS) is a secondary school in Tuen Mun, Hong Kong founded by the Hong Kong Government.  Located at Castle Peak Road near Castle Peak Bay, the school offers classes and uses English as the medium of instruction. It was founded in 1982 and was the first government school in Tuen Mun. Tuen Mun Government Primary School is a feeder school to TMGSS. Hong Kong Christian Service Pui Oi School and Shenzhen Futian Middle School are partner schools of TMGSS.

Class structure
Tuen Mun Government Secondary School has 31 classes in total, with 5 classes each in S.1 to S.5 and 3 classes in S.6. Due to participation in the voluntary class reduction scheme, the number of classes in each level is reduced to 4 starting from year 2011/12. During the transition period of the implementation of the new senior secondary curriculum, the school will have altogether 32 classes(4 in S.1, 5 in S.1 to S.6, 3 in S.7) in year 11/12, which is the highest since its foundation.

New senior secondary curriculum
The School provides 11 elective subjects in New Senior Secondary Curriculum(NSS) and forms school cluster with 3 secondary schools in Tuen Mun District to provide 3 more subjects. There are altogether 14 subjects available.

The school offers places for students from cluster schools in the following subjects: Health Management & Social Care, Tourism & Hospitality Studies, Chinese History. Students can select 2 to 3 subjects. Those taking 3 electives (i.e.3X) should choose one subject from each group without repetition. Those taking 2 electives (i.e.2X) should choose one subject from group 2 and another one from group 1 or 3, and they must have English, Chinese and Mathematics(ECM) enrichment classes.

Students can also take Applied Learning (ApL) courses as one of the elective in S.5 and S.6. The school streams classes according to the choice of the subjects in group 2. The arrangements of elective subjects for the first two NSS school year are not the same.  The school also provides mathematics extended module 2 (Algebra & Calculus) for students starting from S.5. The module 2 lessons occupy part of the normal mathematics lessons and a period of time after school.

*Subjects provided by cluster schools

Footnotes

 a. As many students chose Business, Accounting & Financial Studies, the school provides it in group 3 too. In fact, Business, Accounting & Financial Studies is included in all 3 groups.
 b. Students taking Combined Science (Chemistry+Biology) can not take Chemistry or/and Biology at the same time.
 c. The school did not offer Chinese History but Business, Accounting & Financial Studies instead due to students' lack of interest in the subject.
 d. Students taking one of the two subjects are arranged to the same class but they are not taking both subjects.
 e. It was not offered due to students' lack of interest in the subject.
 f. It was provided since the second NSS school year.

Sources

External links
 Tuen Mun Government Secondary School
 Tuen Mun Government Secondary School Parent-teacher Association
 Tuen Mun Government Secondary School Alumni Association
 Tuen Mun Government Secondary School YouTube Channel
Tuen Mun Government Secondary School Facebook

Secondary schools in Hong Kong
Government schools in Hong Kong
Tuen Mun